The 1972–73 Ottawa Nationals season was the Nationals' only season, as they were one of the original teams in the newly created WHA.  The Nationals played most of the season in Ottawa, but transferred their playoff games to Toronto. Due to low attendance in Ottawa, an arena lease dispute, and much better attendance in their two playoff games in Toronto, where they averaged over 5000 fans per game, the Nationals relocated to Toronto permanently beginning in the next season. The club was renamed the Toronto Toros.

Offseason
The Nationals were originally owned by Doug Michel, with rumours he would place the team in either Hamilton or Toronto, however, and he placed the club in Ottawa.  After the team was placed to play in Ottawa, Nick Trbovich became the majority owner, with Michel running hockey operations.  The club was placed in the six team Eastern Division, with the top four clubs earning a playoff berth.

The Nationals hired former Toronto Maple Leaf Billy Harris to coach the team.  Ottawa's most significant signing was Wayne Carleton, who had previously played with the Maple Leafs, Boston Bruins and California Golden Seals in the NHL.

Regular season
The first game in WHA history was a match between the Nationals and the Alberta Oilers at the Civic Centre, which Alberta won 7–4, on October 11, 1972.  Ottawa recorded their first victory in their fourth game, a 6-2 decision over the Chicago Cougars.  The Nationals reached a season high two games over .500 with a 12-10-1 record, before falling into a long slump in which the club won only seven games in their next 31, and dropped into last place in the Eastern Division.  Ottawa would play very good hockey down the stretch, winning two-thirds of its remaining games, and finished the season at 35-39-4, earning 74 points and the fourth and final playoff position.

Attendance was an issue for the club, as they drew an average of just over 3000 fans per game, competing against the very popular Ottawa 67's OHA team.

Offensively, Ottawa was led by Carleton, who scored a team high 42 goals and 49 assists for 91 points, which ranked him tenth in league scoring.  Twenty-year-old Gavin Kirk earned 68 points in 78 games, while Bob Charlebois earned 64 points. Brian Gibbons had 42 points to lead the team's defencemen, while Rick Cunningham had a team high 121 penalty minutes.

In goal, Gilles Gratton had the majority of playing time, winning 25 games and posting a 3.71 GAA.  Veteran Les Binkley backed him up, earning 10 wins and a GAA of 3.72.

Season standings

Game log

Playoffs
The Nationals would open the playoffs with a best of seven series against the New England Whalers, who had a league high 94 points.  The series opened up with two games in New England, and the Whalers took advantage of their home ice, defeating Ottawa 6-3 and 4–3 to take a two-game series lead.  The series moved to Maple Leaf Gardens in Toronto, as the Nationals ownership decided to move their playoff games from Ottawa due to attendance problems.  The Nationals use their "home ice" advantage in the third game, defeating the Whalers 4–2 to get back into the series, however, New England easily defeated Ottawa in the fourth game 7–3 to take a 3–1 series lead.  The Whalers would close out the series in the fifth game back in New England, as they beat Ottawa 5–4 in overtime to eliminate the Nationals.

New England Whalers 4, Ottawa Nationals 1

Player stats

Regular season
Scoring leaders

Goaltending

Playoffs
Scoring leaders

Goaltending

See also
 1972–73 WHA season

References

SHRP Sports
The Internet Hockey Database
Ottawa Nationals Attendance Figures (Archived 2009-10-21)

Ott
1972–73 WHA season by team